Frequency allocation (or spectrum allocation or spectrum management) is the allocation and regulation of the electromagnetic spectrum into radio frequency bands, normally done by governments in most countries. Because radio propagation does not stop at national boundaries, governments have sought to harmonise the allocation of RF bands and their standardization.

ITU definition
The International Telecommunication Union defines frequency allocation as being of "a given frequency band for the purpose of its use by one or more terrestrial or space radiocommunication services or the radio astronomy service under specified conditions".

Frequency allocation is also a special term, used in national frequency administration. Other terms are:

Bodies
Several bodies set standards for frequency allocation, including:
 International Telecommunication Union (ITU)
 European Conference of Postal and Telecommunications Administrations (CEPT)
 Inter-American Telecommunication Commission (CITEL)

To improve harmonisation in spectrum utilisation, most service allocations are incorporated in national Tables of Frequency Allocations and Utilisations within the responsibility of the appropriate national administration. Allocations are:
 primary
 secondary
 exclusive or shared utilization, within the responsibility of national administrations.

Allocations of military usage will be in accordance with the ITU Radio Regulations. In NATO countries, military mobile utilizations are made in accordance with the NATO Joint Civil/Military Frequency Agreement (NJFA).

Examples of frequency allocations 
Some of the bands listed (e.g., amateur 1.8–29.7 MHz) have gaps / are not continuous allocations.

 BCB is an abbreviation for broadcast band, for commercial radio news and music broadcasts.

See also
Spectrum management
Amateur radio frequency allocations

References

External links 
 International Telecommunication Union (ITU)
 ITU Radio Regulations - Volume 1 (Article 5) international table of frequency allocation by ITU Region. Alternative at ITU persistent link

Broadcast engineering
Radio resource management
Radio spectrum